Herbert Guido Koch (1 July 1880, in Reichenbach – 25 September 1962, in Hamburg) was a German classical archaeologist.

From 1899 he studied archaeology, art history and German philology at the universities of Munich, Berlin and Leipzig, and from 1904 conducted archaeological research in Rome, where he later worked as an assistant at the German Archaeological Institute (1909/10, 1914/15). In 1910/11 he took a study trip to Paris, London, Greece, Asia Minor and Egypt, then in 1912/13 worked as a scientific assistant at the German Archaeological Institute in Athens.

In 1913 he obtained his habilitation at the University of Bonn, and in 1918 became an associate professor of classical archaeology at the University of Jena. In 1923 he attained a full professorship, and in 1929 returned to Leipzig as director of the Archaeological Institute at the university. From 1931 to 1950 he served as professor of classical archaeology at the University of Halle. Among his better known students was art historian Leopold Ettlinger (1913–1989).

Selected works 
 Ueber das Verhältnis von Drama und Geschichte bei Friedrich Hebbel, 1904 – On the relationship of drama and history by Friedrich Hebbel.
 Dachterrakotten aus Campanien mit Ausschluss von Pompei, 1912 – Roof terracotta from Campania with the exclusion of Pompeii.
 Probleme der Spätantike, (with Richard Laqueur and Wilhelm Weber, 1930) – Problems of late antiquity.  
 Römische Kunst, 1949 – Roman art.
 Der griechisch-dorische Tempel, 1951 – Doric Greek temples.
 Studien zum Theseustempel in Athen, 1955 – Studies of the Theseus temple in Athens.
 Von ionischer Baukunst, 1956 – On Ionian architecture.

References 

1880 births
1962 deaths
People from Dzierżoniów
Academic staff of the University of Halle
Academic staff of Leipzig University
Academic staff of the University of Jena
German archaeologists
German art historians
20th-century archaeologists